There are multiple organizations called RCIS, including the Royal Canadian Institute for Science in Toronto, Canada, and the , currently located in Akihabara, Tokyo, Japan, a research unit of National Institute of Advanced Industrial Science and Technology (AIST, 産業総合技術研究所).

Organization
Currently, there are more than 40 international researchers in Research Center for Information Security, divided into four research teams.
 Research Team for Security Fundamentals
 Research Team for Physical Analysis
 Research Team for Software Security
 Research Team for Hardware Security
 ICSS Technology Team

See also
 Research topics

References

External links
 Research Center for Information Security (RCIS)
 Royal Canadian Institute for Science (RCIS) 

Information sensitivity